Roger Margerum (1931–June 21, 2016) was a pioneering African-American architect. He lived in the Lafayette Park neighborhood of Detroit, Michigan.

Biography
Margerum went to DePaul University on a track scholarship, and then studied architecture at the University of Illinois at Urbana–Champaign.

Margerum was raised on the South side of Chicago, with his mother. At the age of 10 he was enrolled in the Art Institute of Chicago for drawing class on Saturday. Margerum followed his mother's suggestion to become an architect and obtained a degree in architecture in 1955 at the University of Illinois. 

As a student he made a speculative approach to Skidmore, Owings & Merrill, who hired him. He began his career with Skidmore, Owings & Merrill, where he was a member of the design team that created modernist buildings for the Air Force Academy campus in Colorado Springs.

In 2000, after leaving full-time practice, his wife Fran, asked him to design a house for them. Completed in 2006, Margerum said, "the only way to satisfy myself was to design something architecturally significant. I believe I’ve done that. To my knowledge, no one before has used the 45-degree polygon as a rigid module."

Margerum died aged 85 on 21 June 2016, near Detroit, due to complications from a stroke.

American Institute of Architects Fellow 
In 1984, Margerum became an American Institute of Architects College of Fellows, the AIA's highest membership honor, for his exceptional work and contributions to architecture and society.

Buildings 
Libby Elementary School- Chicago
North Austin Library
Kettering UAC Interior
45 Degree Angle House 
Roger Margerum House at E. 48th St., Detroit, MI 
The Dr. E. J. Ingram House at 6500 Eberhart, Chicago, IL

References

1931 births
2016 deaths
African-American architects
University of Illinois School of Architecture alumni
DePaul University alumni
20th-century African-American people
21st-century African-American people
Architects from Chicago